The House at 152 Suffolk Road in the Chestnut Hill area of Newton, Massachusetts is a rare local example of the Spanish Mediterranean style of Colonial Revival architecture.  The house, built in 1904, is set apart from more typical Colonial Revival structures by its use of ceramic tile as roofing, stucco walls, and a Mediterranean-style loggia.

The house was listed on the National Register of Historic Places in 1986, and included in an expansion of the Old Chestnut Hill Historic District in 1990.

See also
 National Register of Historic Places listings in Newton, Massachusetts

References

Houses on the National Register of Historic Places in Newton, Massachusetts
Colonial Revival architecture in Massachusetts
Houses completed in 1900
Historic district contributing properties in Massachusetts
National Register of Historic Places in Newton, Massachusetts